Below is listed the BWF World Championships medalists in the men's and women's singles, also in the men's, women's and mixed doubles events. The champion(s) of the tournament win a gold medal, the runners-up take the silver medal, and both losing semifinalists are awarded bronze medals.

History
Since its inaugural edition in 1977, only 21 countries have achieved at least a bronze medal in the tournament: eleven in Asia, eight in Europe, one in Pan America and one in Oceania. Africa is the only continent that has not won a medal.

The big winner at the first edition in Malmö 1977 was Denmark. The country won three golds, a silver, and a bronze, with Lene Køppen winning gold in both singles and mixed doubles event. At the second edition  in Jakarta 1980, the host country sent their players to the finals round in all events. Indonesia had won four titles, except in women's doubles taken by the English pair, Christian Hadinata secured two golds in the men's and mixed doubles events. China and South Korea made their first appearance in the third edition in Copenhagen 1983, and the Chinese team topped the medal standing by winning the women's singles and doubles. China won the remaining three titles in Calgary 1985 and made a truly indelible mark on the next edition by sweeping all five gold medals in Beijing 1987.

At the age of 18, Ratchanok Intanon became the youngest winner of a singles title at the Championships. Ratchanok was less than 3 months older than Jang Hye-ock was when she won the women's doubles title at the 1995 Championships.

In Nanjing 2018, Kento Momota became the first Japanese player to win the gold medal in the men's singles event, also in 2015, he secured first medal for Japan in the men's singles by winning a bronze.

In Basel 2019, for the first time since 1983, China only had one representative in the final round. P.V. Sindhu became the first Indian player to win the gold medal at the World Championships and also became the only other woman singles player along with China's Zhang Ning to have won five World Championship medals. Japanese Kento Momota, and the duo Mayu Matsumoto and Wakana Nagahara retained their titles from the previous edition. Japanese mixed doubles pair Yuta Watanabe and Arisa Higashino and the Thai men's singles player Kantaphon Wangcharoen, became the first players from their countries that won medals in the mixed doubles and men's singles events respectively.

Men's singles

Women's singles

Men's doubles

Women's doubles

Mixed doubles

References

External links
Official website

BWF World Championships